The Carrier-Chilcotin Tribal Council is a First Nations tribal council located in the Chilcotin District of the Central Interior of the Canadian province of British Columbia, and also on the Fraser River near the city of Quesnel. It consists of three Carrier bands and one Tsilhqot'in band. The other Tsilhqot'in bands belong to the Tsilhqot'in National Government. Most other Carrier bands are either unaffiliated or belong to the Carrier-Sekani Tribal Council. The Tribal Council's offices are in Williams Lake.

Member governments
Kluskus First Nation (at the Kluskus Lakes, west of Quesnel) - Lhoosk'uz people
Red Bluff First Nation (Quesnel) - Lhtako people
Toosey First Nation (near Riske Creek) - Tl'esqox people
Ulkatcho First Nation (Anahim Lake) - Ulkatchot'en people

Treaty Process

History
The council began in the early 1980s as the Chilcotin Protocol Office before changing its name to the Chilcotin Ulkatcho Kluskus Tribal Council.  In 1991, it was again renamed the Carrier Chilcotin Tribal Council.

Demographics

Economic Development

Social, Educational and Cultural Programs and Facilities

See also
Tsilhqot'in
Chilcotin language
Chilcotin War
Klattasine
Anahim
Alexis (chief)
Dakelh
Carrier language
Tsilhqot'in Tribal Council
List of tribal councils in British Columbia

External links
CCTC website

References 

First Nations tribal councils in British Columbia
Dakelh governments
Central Interior of British Columbia
Cariboo
Chilcotin Country
Tsilhqot'in governments